Bjørnson is a Norwegian surname with the literal meaning "Son of Bjørn". Bjornson, Bjørnson, Bjørnsen, Björnsson and variations can refer to the following people:

Icelanders
Ármann Smári Björnsson (born 1981), Icelandic footballer
Björn Th. Björnsson (1922-2007), Icelandic writer
Georgia Björnsson (1884–1957), Danish-born wife of Sveinn Björnsson, first president of Iceland
Hafþór Júlíus Björnsson (born 1988), Icelandic strongman and actor
Sveinn Björnsson (1881-1952), first president of Iceland
Sveinn Birkir Björnsson (born 1976), editor of The Reykjavík Grapevine

Norwegians
Bjørnstjerne Bjørnson (1832-1910), Norwegian writer and a 1903 Nobel Prize in Literature laureate
Bjørn Bjørnson (1859-1942), Norwegian stage actor and theatre director, son of Bjørnstjerne Bjørnson 
Gudrød Bjørnsson, Norwegian politician in Middle Ages, grandfather of Saint Olaf
Ivar Bjørnson (born 1977), Norwegian musician in Black Metal band Enslaved
Øyvind Bjørnson, (1950–2007) was Norwegian historian

Swedes
Erik Björnsson, 9th century semi-legendary Swedish king
Johan Björnsson Printz, governor of New Sweden from 1643 to 1653
Olof (II) Björnsson, 10th century semi-legendary Swedish king

Other nationalities
Craig Bjornson (born 1969), American baseball coach
David Bjornson (born 1947), Canadian politician
Eric Bjornson (born 1971), American football player
Karen Bjornson (born 1952), American model
Maria Björnson (1949-2002), French theatre stage designer
Mette Koefoed Bjørnsen (1920–2008), Danish author, conciliator and economist
Oscar Bjornson (1906-1972), Canadian politician
Peter Bjornson, Canadian politician
Rosella Bjornson (born 1947), Canadian airline pilot
Val Bjornson (1906-1987), American politician

See also
Christina Bjornsdatter, queen of Sweden
Selma Björnsdóttir, Icelandic singer

Norwegian-language surnames